Marmoricola scoriaes is a Gram-positive bacterium from the genus Marmoricola which has been isolated from volcanic ash from Jeju Island, Korea.

References

External links 
Type strain of Marmoricola scoriae at BacDive -  the Bacterial Diversity Metadatabase

Propionibacteriales
Bacteria described in 2010